The Achy Breaky Hearts is a 2016 Filipino romantic comedy film directed by Antoinette Jadaone and starring Richard Yap and Jodi Sta. Maria. The film was produced by Star Cinema and to be released on June 29, 2016, in theaters nationwide.

The film was inspired by the 1992 pop hit of the same title by American singer Billy Ray Cyrus.

The film was also intended to cash-in from the success of two of Jodi Sta. Maria's previous TV projects: Be Careful With My Heart, where she starred opposite Richard Yap, and Pangako Sa 'Yo remake where she starred opposite Ian Veneracion.

Synopsis
Chinggay (Jodi Sta. Maria), a jewelry shop manager, is one of the single women in their 30s who feels the pressure to find love. She goes out on dates with men but none of them seem to make the cut. You may blame her high standards but the pain from her previous relationship could also be affecting her judgment on men. Now, her love life is suffering a drought for seven years. Everything changes when suddenly, two men are interested to be with her. Ryan (Ian Veneracion) bought an engagement ring from Chinggay only to be rejected by his girlfriend. Chinggay helps Ryan to get back with his girlfriend but they end up losing the ring and becoming good friends. On the other hand, Chinggay’s ex-boyfriend Frank (Richard Yap) is persistent to redeem himself and to prove that he deserves a second chance with Chinggay. Chinggay finds herself torn between two kinds of love. A guy who she still loves, and a guy she now loves. Will she choose one over the other? Or will she realize that the love that she needs won’t come from either?

Cast

Main cast
Jodi Sta. Maria as Chinggay Villanueva
Richard Yap as Frank Sison

Supporting cast
Beauty Gonzalez as Ingrid
Sarah Lahbati as Martha
Desiree Del Valle as Corrine
Erika Padilla as Maxie
Denise Joaquin as Joan
Khalil Ramos as Keith
Shamaine Buencamino as Aida Villanueva
Miles Ocampo as Jenny Villanueva
John Spainhour as Chino
Elizabeth Ty Chua
Yuan Francisco as Aaron
Eda Nolan as Trisha Villanueva
Bernard Palanca
Michael Flores

Piracy issue
Days after the movie's theater release, a pirated copy of it had been leaked online on social media and filesharing sites. The director and the cast all tweeted against piracy and had sworn to take legal actions against everyone responsible for the leak.

References

External links

2016 films
Star Cinema films
2016 romantic comedy films
Philippine romantic comedy films
2010s Tagalog-language films
Films directed by Antoinette Jadaone
2010s English-language films